The Dearly Precious Stakes is an American Thoroughbred horse race held annually in mid February at Aqueduct Racetrack in Queens, New York. Open to three-year-old fillies, the non-graded stakes is contested on dirt over a distance of six furlongs.

The race is named in honor of Dearly Precious, the 1975 American Champion Two-Year-Old Filly who was in the hunt for another Championship at age three when she suffered a career-ending injury on July 11, 1976 while winning the Dark Mirage Stakes at Aqueduct Racetrack.

Records
Speed record:
 1:10.20 - T Storm (1999)

Most wins by a jockey:
 2 - Richard Migliore (1997, 2002)
 2 - Aaron Gryder (1998, 2000)
 2 - Mario Pino (2004, 2008)

Most wins by a trainer:
 No trainer has won this race more than once.

Most wins by an owner:
 No owner has won this race more than once.

Winners

References
 The 2009 Dearly Precious Stakes at Sports Illustrated

Ungraded stakes races in the United States
Horse races in New York City
Flat horse races for three-year-old fillies
Recurring sporting events established in 1995
Aqueduct Racetrack
1995 establishments in New York City